Maria Temryukovna (Kabardian: Гуэщэней Идар Темрыкъуэ и пхъу, c. 1544 – 1 September 1569) was a Circassian Tsaritsa of the Tsardom of Russia and second spouse to Ivan the Terrible.

Life

The daughter of Temryuk of Kabardia, Maria (originally named Qochenay bint Teymour (Кученей) before her baptism) was presented to Ivan in Moscow after the death of his first wife Anastasia Romanovna. Russian folklore tells of how Ivan's first wife, before dying, warned him not to take a pagan as a wife. Ivan was so smitten by Maria's beauty, that he decided to marry her immediately. On 21 August 1561, they married, four days before Ivan's 31st birthday. The marriage took place after the marriage negotiations between Ivan and Catherine Jagiellon stranded.

Ivan soon came to regret the decision to marry her, on account of his new wife being viewed as illiterate and vindictive. She never fully integrated to the Muscovite way of life, and was considered a poor stepmother to Ivan's two sons Ivan and Feodor. She gave birth to a son named Vasili, named after her father-in-law on 21 March 1563, though he died on 3 May that same year. Maria was generally hated by her subjects, who believed her to be manipulative and witch-like in her behaviour. Some historians  write that it was she who first incited her husband to form the oprichniki.

She died on 1 September 1569 at the age of 25. It was rumored that she had been poisoned by her own husband, but there is no historical evidence to such rumours. The Tsar also never admitted as such, and had many people tortured on suspicion of assassinating the Tsaritsa.

Appearances in modern media
Tsar a 2009 Russian drama film directed by Pavel Lungin.
Their story is described in the book ‘Der Leibarzt der Zarin’ by Heinz Konsalik.
She also appears (as Marie) in George's Bizet's opera Ivan IV.

References

 Troyat, Henri Ivan le Terrible. Flammarion, Paris, 1982
 de Madariaga, Isabel Ivan the Terrible. Giulio Einaudi editore, 2005

|-

|-

1544 births
1569 deaths
Kabardino-Balkaria
Circassian people of Russia
Circassian nobility
Converts to Eastern Orthodoxy from Islam
Russian former Muslims
Burials at Ascension Convent
Wives of Ivan the Terrible